El Inútil is a Colombian telenovela by Teleset for RCN Television, starring Ruddy Rodriguez, Victor Mallarino, Julian Arango and Manuela Gonzalez in 2001.

Synopsis
Mirando Zapata is a businessman and industrial footwear, a husband, and father of two beautiful daughters. He is married to Ruby.

Miranda, Mirando's older daughter, gets involved with Martin Martinez, a typical child of Daddy and Mommy, who does not have to make any efforts to get what he wants. What Martin does not know is that Ruby, the love of his life, is Miranda's stepmother.

Martin's parents have always been distant with him, leaving his upbringing in the hands of Teresa, his nanny, and her husband Rafael. It was from Rafael, who is party musician, that Martin got his love of music and dance.

Martin is a waste of birth, no effort need to see the light of the world through a caesarean section, but the fault is not to be because the women around him have not allowed him to take charge of your life.

Cast
 Julián Arango.... Martín Martínez Köppel
 Ruddy Rodríguez.... Rubiela "Ruby" Salcedo de Zapata
 Víctor Mallarino.... Mirando Zapata
 Manuela González.... Miranda Zapata
 Constanza Duque.... Adelaida Köppel de Martinez
 Germán Quintero.... Francisco Martínez
 Antonio Sanint.... Fernando Fernández
 Janeth Waldman.... Rosario de Fernández
 Jorge Herrera.... Gerardo Ruiz
 Gerardo De Francisco.... Fernán Fernández
 Teresa Gutiérrez....  Doña Lucy
 Adriana Ricardo.... Mónica Julitza Paternina
 Sebastián Sánchez.... Gabriel Gaviria
 Lorena McCallister.... Margarita de Gaviria
 Javier Gnecco Jr.... Gabo Gaviria
 Patricia Grisales.... Úrsula Salcedo
 Jorge Herrera.... Gerardo Ruiz
 Juan Pablo Posada.... Jerry Ruiz
 Adriana Campos.... Jakie Ruiz
 María José Tafur.... Lucero Zapata
 Carolina Trujillo.... Marinita Vda de Köppel
 Martha Isabel Bolaños.... Esmeralda
 Víctor Cifuentes.... Concejal
 Santiago Moure.... Don Efrain
 Sandra Pérez.... Liliana
 Hanna Zea.... Dora
 Rosalba Goenaga.... Teresa
 Antún Castro.... Rafael
 Jorge Monterrosa.... Alfredo
 Rosa María Ramírez.... Tránsito
 Diana Galeano.... Aracelly
 Genoveva Caro.... Juanita Holguín
 Anderson Balsero.... Roland
 Víctor Hugo Cabrera.... Juan de Dios
 Jerónimo Basile.... Salvatore
 David Ortiz.... Martín (niño)
 Betty Sánchez.... Teresa (joven)
 Facio Candia.... Rafael (joven)
 Manuel José Chávez.... Martín (joven)
 Elkin Díaz
 Hector Barsola....Niño deforme

Awards

2002 TVyNovela Awards
 Favorite Antagonist Victor Mallarino

2002 India Catalina Awards
  Best antagonist actor Victor Mallarino

2001 telenovelas
Colombian telenovelas
2001 Colombian television series debuts
2002 Colombian television series endings
Television series by Teleset
RCN Televisión telenovelas
Spanish-language telenovelas
Television shows set in Colombia